Midsummer men is a common name for several plants in the family Crassulaceae and may refer to:

Hylotelephium telephium
Rhodiola rosea